Bulbophyllum conspectum is a species of orchid in the genus Bulbophyllum.

References

conspectum
Plants described in 1927